The 1963-64 Kangaroo tour was the eleventh Kangaroo tour, during which the Australian national rugby league team traveled to Europe and played thirty-six matches against British and French club and representative teams. It included three Test matches against Great Britain for The Ashes, and three Tests against the French. The tour followed the 1959-60 Kangaroo tour of Great Britain and France and was followed by the 1967-68 Kangaroo tour of Great Britain and France.

The squad's leadership 
The Australian team was captain-coached by Western Suburbs Magpies  Arthur Summons, though due to injury to Summons the test captaincy fell to St George  Ian Walsh for Ashes series against Great Britain and the first test against France.
In the five matches in which neither Summons nor Walsh played, the Kangaroos were captained by Barry Muir (against Featherstone), Ken Irvine (Rochdale), Noel Kelly (Cumberland), Reg Gasnier (Pyrenees) and Brian Hambly (Les Espoirs (French Colts)).
The team was managed by Jack Lynch and Arthur Sparkes.

Touring squad 
The Rugby League News published details of the touring team including each player's ages, weight, height and occupation. 
Match details - listing surnames of both teams and the point scorers - were included in E.E. Christensen's Official Rugby League Yearbook, as was a summary of the players' point-scoring. 
John Cleary, Ken Day, Peter Gallagher, John Gleeson and Barry Muir were selected from Queensland clubs. Earl Harrison, Paul Quinn and Barry Rushworth were selected from clubs in New South Wales Country areas. The balance of the squad had played for Sydney based clubs during the 1963 season.

Great Britain 
The Ashes series against Great Britain saw an aggregate crowd of 65,286 attending the Test series. The largest attendance of the tour came during the Kangaroos 50-12 second test win over Great Britain at Station Road in Swinton with 30,843 in attendance. The largest non-test attendance of the tour was 21,284 when the Kangaroos defeated St. Helens at Knowsley Road.

Test venues 
The three Ashes series tests took place at the following venues.

The Ashes series

First Test 
The first Ashes series test was played at the famous Wembley Stadium in London. Reg Gasnier ran in 3 of the Kangaroos 6 tries while his St George team mate and centre partner Graeme Langlands kicked 5 goals and crossed for his own try. In front of a small crowd of only 13,946 (in a stadium which at the time could hold up to 100,000 and earlier in the year had seen a crowd of 84,488 for the Challenge Cup Final), the Kangaroos kept the Lions scoreless with Neil Fox's lone goal the only score for the home side as Australia won 28-2.

Second Test 
The second test at Station Road in Swinton has gone down in rugby league folklore as the "Swinton Massacre". The Kangaroos ran riot, crossing for 12 tries to just 2 from the Lions. The 50-12 win was not only the Kangaroos highest ever score against Great Britain, it also saw Australia win The Ashes in England for the first time since 1911–12 and the first time an all-Australian team (the 1911–12 squad included New Zealand players) had won The Ashes in England. British fans got a taste of Ken Irvine's legendary speed when he crossed for three long range tries while Reg Gasnier, Peter Dimond and Graeme Langlands all crossed for doubles with Langlands also kicking 7 goals for a personal tally of 20 points. Though on this day there was none better than Kangaroos lock forward Johnny Raper who while not scoring himself, had a hand in 9 of his teams 12 tries.

Third Test 
With pride on the line as no England or Great Britain team had ever lost a home series 3-0 to Australia, The Lions put in a much improved performance at Headingley in Leeds. The Rugby Football League had appointed "Sergeant Major" Eric Clay as the referee for the game. The two sides set about settling scores and the Australians felt Clay was biased. It is considered was one of the most brutal Tests ever played, with two Australians (Barry Muir and Brian Hambly) and one British player (Cliff Watson) being sent off. Muir who was sent off (for kicking) later told that he first told Clay "where to go" as he left the field, and later approached Clay after the game and said to him "You robbed us". According to Muir, Clay reportedly responded with "Barry, I've got to live here".

Ken Irvine, who scored Australia's only try for the match, repeated his efforts from the 1962 Ashes series by scoring a try in each test of an Ashes series.

France 
The Rugby League News published a list of Match Results in a February 1964 special issue.

|- bgcolor="#CCCCFF"
| Date
| Opponent
| Score
| Ground
| Referee
| Crowd
| Report
|- bgcolor="#FFFFFF"
| 5 December 1963
| Celtic de Paris
| 2 – 30
| Stade Pershing, Paris
|
| 200
|
|-
|- bgcolor=pink
| 8 December 1963
| France
| 8 – 5
| Stade Chaban-Delmas, Bordeaux
| A. Cassan (FRA)
| 4,261
| 
|-
|- bgcolor="#FFFFFF"
| 12 December 1963
| Basque / Bearnaise XIII
| 5 – 18
|
|
| 4,261
|
|-
|- bgcolor="#FFFFFF"
| 15 December 1963
| South West France
| 11 – 41
| Stade Jules Ribet, Saint-Gaudens
|
| 1,266
|
|-
|- bgcolor="#FFFFFF"
| 19 December 1963
| Pyrenees
| 10 – 14
| Stade Jules Ribet, Saint-Gaudens
|
| 2,059
|
|-
|- bgcolor=pink
| 22 December 1963
| France
| 10 – 14
| Stade des Minimes, Toulouse
| E. Martung (FRA)
| 6,932
| 
|-
|- bgcolor="#FFFFFF"
| 25 December 1963
| Rouergue XIII
| 2 – 13
| Stade Municipal d'Albi, Albi
|
| 3,780
|
|-
|- bgcolor="#FFFFFF"
| 29 December 1963
| Languedoc XIII
| 12 – 16
| Stade Albert Domec, Carcassonne
|
| 6,143
|
|-
|- bgcolor="#FFFFFF"
| 4 January 1963
| XIII Catalan
| 15 – 11
| Stade Jean-Laffon, Perpignan
|
| 4,524
|
|-
|- bgcolor="#FFFFFF"
| 4 January 1964
| South France
| 11 – 51
|
|
| 889
|
|-
|- bgcolor="#FFFFFF"
| 5 January 1964
| Provence XIII
| 4 – 35
| Parc des Sports, Avignon
|
| 2,009
|
|-
|- bgcolor="#FFFFFF"
| 12 January 1964
| Roanne XIII
| 2 – 38
|
|
| 2,969
|
|-
|- bgcolor="#FFFFFF"
| 16 January 1964
| Les Espoirs (Colts)
| 12 – 19
|
|
| 2,617
|
|-
|- bgcolor=pink
| 18 January 1964
| France
| 8 – 16
| Parc des Princes, Paris
| G. Jameau (FRA)
| 5,979
| 
|-

French Tests

First test 
Although Ken Irvine was unavailable due to injury, The Kangaroos lost nothing with pace on the wing due to the selection of South Sydney flyer and dual-rugby international Michael Cleary who 12 months earlier had won the Bronze Medal in the 100 yards sprint at the 1962 Commonwealth Games. However it wasn't enough as the tourists were defeated 8-5 by a determined French.

Second Test

Third Test

References

External links 
 1963-64 Kangaroo Tour at Rugby League Project

Australia national rugby league team tours
Rugby league tours of Great Britain
Rugby league tours of France
Kangaroo Tour
Kangaroo Tour